Bertschi AG is a Swiss transport company that provides logistics and transport for the chemical industry. The company was founded in 1956, and is headquartered in Durrenasch, Switzerland. Bertschi is a member of the European Chemical Transport Association. 

Bertschi AG started operating a tank farm in 1998 at Chempark Leverkusen. The company purchased Swedish based Nordic Bulkers AB in 2005.

Bertschi AG has subsidiaries  throughout Europe, the Middle East, Russia, Singapore, Turkey, China and the United States. As of February 2018, the company employs 2,800 people in 38 countries with a total fleet of 32,000 tank and silo containers; 1,100 trucks; and 30 container terminals.

References

External links
 Official website

Logistics companies of Switzerland